False River may refer to:

 False River (California)
 False River (Louisiana)    
 False River (Quebec)